Reedham railway station may refer to:

Reedham railway station (Norfolk)
Reedham railway station (London), in Purley, London, England